Rosengård Centrum is a neighbourhood of Malmö, situated in the district of Öster, Malmö Municipality, Skåne County, Sweden. It has a shopping centre, which opened in 1971.

References

Neighbourhoods of Malmö

sv:Rosengård#Service - Rosengård centrum